Keith Raymond Westbrook (28 May 1887 – 20 January 1982) was an Australian cricketer. He was a right-handed batsman and right-arm bowler who played for Tasmania. He was born in Scottsdale and died in Burnie.

Westbrook made a single first-class appearance for the team, during the 1909-10 season, against Victoria. From the lower order, he scored 35 runs in the first innings in which he batted, and 25 runs in the second. Westbrook had figures of 0-51 from 16 overs of bowling.

His uncle and his brother also played first-class cricket for Tasmania.

See also
 List of Tasmanian representative cricketers

References

External links
 
Keith Westbrook at Cricket Archive

1887 births
1982 deaths
Australian cricketers
Tasmania cricketers
Cricketers from Tasmania